Aselbach is a small river of Hesse, Germany. It flows into the Edersee near Vöhl. It is located between Asel and Asel-Süd/Vöhl. Aselbach is noted as both a waterway and water area. There are 25 other rivers around the same area.

See also
List of rivers of Hesse

References

Rivers of Hesse
Rivers of Germany